A cricketer scoring a century (100 runs or more) on their One Day International (ODIs) debut is regarded by critics as a significant achievement. As of January 2021, 16 players from 10 different international teams have accomplished this feat. Players representing nine of the twelve teams that have full member status have scored an ODI century on debut.

England's Dennis Amiss was the first debutant to score a century in ODIs; he scored 103 runs off 134 balls against Australia during the first match of the Prudential Trophy in 1972. His total was surpassed by Desmond Haynes of West Indies when he made 148 against Australia in 1978. As of 2019, this remains the highest individual score by a debutant in ODIs. In a 1992 World Cup game against Sri Lanka, Andy Flower made 115 not out while making his first ODI appearance, representing Zimbabwe. It remains the only World Cup century by a debutant as of the 2015 tournament. In September 1995, Pakistan's Saleem Elahi set a record for becoming the youngest player to achieve the feat; aged 18, he was yet to play first-class cricket then. Between 1972 and 1995 only four players had scored a century on their ODI debut. However, since 2009, twelve players have achieved the feat. South African Reeza Hendricks holds the record of fastest century by a batsman on ODI debut (88 balls). Of the 16 occasions a cricketer has scored a century on ODI debut, their team has lost only 3 times.

Key

One Day International centuries on debut

Footnotes

References

Bibliography

One Day International debut